Chaffee is an unincorporated community in Cass County, North Dakota, United States.

History
A post office was established at Chaffee in 1894, and remained in operation until 1966.  The community, named for promoter Eben Chaffee, was platted in 1898 soon after the railroad was extended to that point.

Herbert Fuller Chaffee (Eben's son) was a first-class passenger aboard the RMS Titanic, with his wife Carrie Constance Toogood. She survived, but his body was never recovered.

References

Unincorporated communities in North Dakota
Populated places established in 1894
Unincorporated communities in Cass County, North Dakota